Manjača is a name of a mountain located 22 km south of the city Banja Luka, in northern part of Republika Srpska, Bosnia and Herzegovina.

History
The region was a stronghold during World War II for Serbian nationalist Chetnik fighters. After the climax of the war, the new communist government of Josip Broz Tito dispersed the local Serb population as retribution and established a large army base and firing range for the new Yugoslav People's Army (JNA).

It held a significant military base of the JNA in the second part of 20th century and was one of the military strongholds of the Army of Republika Srpska during the Bosnian War. The mountain became internationally renowned as it was the site of the Manjača prison camp run by Republika Srpska authorities.

References

External links

Mountains of Republika Srpska
Mountains of Bosnia and Herzegovina